Blignaut is an Afrikaans surname, prevalent in South Africa.

Notable people with this surname include:
 Audrey Blignault (1916–2008), South African writer
 Calvin Blignault (1979–2010), South African engineer

See also
 Blignaut

References

Afrikaans-language surnames